Maharashtra Cricket Association Stadium is a cricket stadium situated in Pune, Maharashtra, India. It is located beside the Pune Mumbai expressway in Pune district.

It is the home venue of the Maharashtra cricket team and is the headquarters of the Maharashtra Cricket Association (MCA). This stadium is situated on the outskirts of city limit of Pune in Gahunje village. Before existence of this arena, Nehru Stadium of downtown Pune was the home ground of Maharashtra Cricket team and venue for international matches organised by MCA.

This arena is designed by Michael Hopkins. It is designed like a deep bowl. It has floodlights to organise contests at night.

Hopkins Architects of London was commissioned to design a new 37,000-seat stadium in Pune. This stadium's final phase of construction is still yet to complete.

In 2012, it was inaugurated by then BCCI and ICC president Sharad Pawar. In April 2012, the first match was played between Kings XI Punjab and Pune Warriors in April 2012. The first Twenty20 International match at the stadium was played between India and England in December 2012. The first Test match at the venue was played between India and Australia in February 2017.

History

The MCA's decision to build a new Cricket stadium in Pune stemmed from a dispute with the Pune Municipal Corporation, regarding ticket allocations for Nehru Stadium. This conflict came to a head when an international match between India and Sri Lanka was moved to Kolkata, with the MCA stating they were in no position to host the match. Following this, the MCA decided a new stadium was needed.

The groundbreaking ceremony was performed on the construction site on 21 October 2007 by the BCCI president Sharad Pawar. MCA granted the contract to construct the first phase of the construction to  M/S Shapoorji Pallonji & Co. Ltd company in November 2009. The construction work started on 14 November 2007.

MCA Pune was inaugurated by the then ICC President and Agriculture Minister Sharad Pawar on 1 April 2012.

In 2013, the Indian company Sahara India Pariwar bought the naming rights and the stadium was renamed the Subrata Roy Sahara Stadium. However, the name was changed back to the Maharashtra Cricket Association Stadium because Sahara paid only a part of the Rs. 200 crore that it had promised when acquiring the rights.

The major part of the construction is completed but the final phase of the construction is still yet to complete. This arena is designed by British architect Sir Michael Hopkins, who credited to designed Lord's cricket ground's mount stand and Ages bowl Stadium of Southampton in England.

In November 2015, the stadium was selected as one of the six new Test venues along with Holkar Stadium, JSCA International Stadium Complex, Saurashtra Cricket Association Stadium, Himachal Pradesh Cricket Association Stadium and Dr. Y.S. Rajasekhara Reddy ACA-VDCA Cricket Stadium in India.

The stadium has been home ground for Pune Warriors India, Punjab Kings, Rising Pune Supergiant and Chennai Super Kings in the Indian Premier League.

Construction

The stadium was designed by British architecture company, Hopkins Architects. However, the stadium was not ready until 2012. As a result, the stadium was not able to host ICC Cricket World Cup matches as originally intended.

The arena is located close to the Mumbai–Pune Expressway, just outside the city of Pune, with views of the surrounding mountains.

The stadium and the seating arrangement were designed in such a way that an unobstructed view is assured from each location.

The most important feature of this stadium is its rainwater drainage system. Often, matches are abandoned due to heavy downpour. To overcome this problem, MCA opted for a sand-based outfield developed departmentally with technical assistance from STRI Limited, UK. Due to this technology, even during heavy showers, water on the outfield drains out fast, making it ready for play again just in few minutes.

Notable events
In 2015 IPL, Punjab Kings decided to move out of Mohali due to lukewarm spectator response at their primary home ground. Following the decision three home games were played at the MCA Stadium.

In 2018 IPL, due to members of a few fringe political parties staging protests outside the M. A. Chidambaram Stadium, Chennai as well as several parts of Chennai demanding the IPL matches to be moved out of the city until the Cauvery Management Board (CMB) was set up as directed by the honourable Supreme Court of India. Despite tight security for the match against KKR, the Chennai police expressed their inability in ensuring enough personnel at the venue for the smooth conduct of the remaining games. MCA Stadium in Pune was selected to host the remaining six home games of Chennai Super Kings.

On 28 March 2021, MCA Stadium completed its 50th competitive match milestone during the India vs England 3rd ODI Match.

Controversy 
In 2017, Indian TV network India Today exposed this stadium's official pitch curator Salgaonkar on sting operation, the network alleged Salgaonkar for malpractice before India vs New Zealand ODI match of New Zealand tour of India. In response to that Mahrashtra Cricket Association sacked Salgaonkar from the job. According to  cricket.com.au''',  the pitch curator showed batting pitch to the men around the Pune, which is clear breach of ICC rule to governing access to the Cricket pitch in international cricket matches. The second ODI went ahead on schedule after the pitch had been inspected by match referee Chris Broad. The India Today footage of Salgaonkar speaking with a reporter, who was posing as a bookmaker, was broadcast a few hours before the match. India Today alleged that Salgaonkar shared information about the wicket to their undercover reporter about possible score and Salgaonkar was ready to tamper wicket for bounce. As per India Today their undercover reporter accompanied by Salgaonkar permitted to tapp, test walk and stamp with the feet to the pitch. The curator guaranteed to doctor the pitch according to demand.

Salgaonkar was suspended for 6 months from the curator position by BCCI and ICC, after that he returned on the job at MCA as curator.

In 2017, Pune pitch used for the first test of India vs Australia series rated poor by ICC match referee Chris Broad in his match report. 

In 2018 Bombay High court restricted Maharashtra Cricket Association (MCA) to use Pavana river water for the maintenance of this stadium's ground. Bombay court gave this verdict in response to a Public interest litigation field by a NGO, Loksatta movement. Maharashtra government granted the permission to use the water of Pavana river for industrial purpose to MCA. The judges of Bombay High court said that, "We are shocked to note that for a period of six years, the state government has allowed the MCA to draw water from the Pavana river for industrial purposes when admittedly the MCA is not running any industry. The water is being used for the stadium” and to do so was illegal.

Feature

The MPIC project included:

 A main 15 wicket match ground
 Adjacent practice ground with nets, for practice and smaller matches
 Spectator seating for 37,406 grouped into 4 stands
 A Members' Pavilion and a media stand
 Additional facilities for 5,000 members including squash and badminton courts, a swimming pool, spa, restaurants and bars
 80 corporate hospitality boxes
 A state-of-the-art indoor Cricket Academy with residential accommodation for youth training schemes
 Parking for almost 4,000 cars and 10,000 two-wheelers

List of centuries

Key
 * denotes that the batsman was not out.
 Inns. denotes the number of the innings in the match.
 Balls denotes the number of balls faced in an innings.
 NR denotes that the number of balls was not recorded.
 Parentheses next to the player's score denotes his century number at Edgbaston.
 The column title Date refers to the date the match started.
 The column title Result''' refers to the player's team result

Test centuries

One Day Internationals

List of five wicket hauls

Key

Tests

Gallery

References

External links 
 hopkins
 internationalsportsturf 

Buildings by Hopkins Architects
Cricket grounds in Maharashtra
Sports venues in Pune
Sports venues completed in 2012
Cricket grounds in Pune
Sport in Pimpri-Chinchwad
Test cricket grounds in India
2012 establishments in Maharashtra